In 1995, on the occasion of the 100th anniversary of cinema, the Vatican compiled a list called Some Important Films (Italian: Alcuni film importanti). The 45 movies are divided into three categories: religion, values, and art.

Religion

 Andrei Rublev (1966)
 Babette's Feast (1987)
 Ben-Hur (1959)
 The Flowers of St. Francis (1950)
 Francesco (1989)
 The Gospel According to St. Matthew (1964)
 La Passion de Notre Seigneur Jesus-Christ (1905)
 A Man for All Seasons (1966)
 The Mission (1986)
 Monsieur Vincent (1947)
 Nazarin (1958)
 Ordet (1955)
 The Passion of Joan of Arc (1928)
 The Sacrifice (1986)
 Therese (1986)

Values

 Au Revoir les Enfants (1988)
 Bicycle Thieves (1949)
 The Burmese Harp (1956)
 Chariots of Fire (1981)
 Dekalog (1988)
 Dersu Uzala (1975)
 Gandhi (1982)
 Intolerance (1916)
 It's a Wonderful Life (1946)
 On the Waterfront (1954)
 Rome, Open City (1945)
 Schindler's List (1993)
 The Seventh Seal (1957)
 The Tree of Wooden Clogs (1978)
 Wild Strawberries (1957)

Art

 Citizen Kane (1941)
 8½ (1963)
 Fantasia (1940)
 Grand Illusion (1937)
 La Strada (1954)
 The Lavender Hill Mob (1951)
 The Leopard (1963)
 Little Women (1933)
 Metropolis (1927)
 Modern Times (1936)
 Napoleon (1927)
 Nosferatu (1922)
 Stagecoach (1939)
 2001: A Space Odyssey (1968)
 The Wizard of Oz (1939)

References

  
 

Top film lists
Catholicism and society
1995 works
Films